Olive Kingsley Chadeayne (February 9, 1904 - February 23, 2001) was an American architect who worked primarily in California from 1927 to 1970.

Early life and education
Though born in New York, at the age of eleven Chadeayne moved with her family to Van Nuys in southern California. She began studying architecture in 1922 at UCLA, but transferred to the University of California, Berkeley in 1923 after the program at UCLA was discontinued. She graduated in 1926 with her B.A., after which she continued with post-graduate studies for one year, receiving her master's in 1927.

Career
Following her graduation, Chadeayne sought work at a number of Los Angeles-based firms, but found that few would consider hiring a woman. Eventually she was able to find work as a draftsperson at the firm of Pierpoint and Walter S. Davis. After their office closed during the Depression, she was able to find work in the mid-1930s with the architect and fellow UC Berkeley alumna Lilian Jeannette Rice. Based in the Rancho Santa Fe area, she specialized in residences and civic buildings in the Spanish Colonial Revival style. Following Rice's death from ovarian cancer in late 1938, Chadeayne completed several of her unfinished projects and closed the firm's office soon thereafter. She began to teach a House Planning course at Cornell University as part of the Home Economics curriculum, but returned to Burbank, California in 1942, where she worked as a production illustrator for the Lockheed Corporation for the rest of World War II.

Chadeayne resumed her own practice following the war, while contracting with other firms. In 1951, she took a job with the large firm David, Mann, Johnson, and Mendenhall where she became experienced in writing specifications, which developed into her specialty for the remainder of her career. She retired in 1970, but continued to work on a part-time basis and shared her expertise through organizations like the Association for Women Architects and the American Institute of Architects.

Notable projects

Buildings, designs
Entrance lobby, Pasadena Civic Auditorium, Pasadena, California (1932)
Burroughs Residence, La Jolla, California (1938)
Cramer Residence, Studio City, California (1945)
Stratton Store, Van Nuys, California (1946)
Bevis Residence, Patterson, California (1949 - 1953)
Theis Residence, Huntington Palisades, California (1950)
Theis Residence, Los Angeles, California (1950 - 1951)
Schiebel Residence, Pacific Palisades, California (1956)

Buildings, specifications
U.S. Consulate in Singapore, Singapore
Bank of America Headquarters, 555 California Street, San Francisco, California (1966 - 1970)

See also
 Lilian Jeannette Rice
 List of women architects
 The International Archive of Women in Architecture
 List of California women architects

References

Further reading
 Horton, Inge S. Early Women Architects of the San Francisco Bay Area : The Lives and Work of Fifty Professionals, 1890-1951. Jefferson: McFarland & Co, 2010.
 Torre, Susana (ed.). Women in American Architecture: A Historic and Contemporary Perspective. New York: Whitney Library of Design, 1977.

External links
 
 

Architects from California
1904 births
2001 deaths
UC Berkeley College of Environmental Design alumni
People from Tracy, California
California women architects
20th-century American women